Vietnam's Next Top Model, Cycle 1 is the first cycle of Top Model franchise to be produced in Vietnam by Vietnam Television and Multimedia JSC. The premiere was on September 30, 2010. In the season finale, the top 3 competed against each other on a stage.

The season filmed entirely in Ho Chi Minh City and featured 18 competitors aged between 18 and 25 and whose height was 5'5" and over.

The winner was 20-year-old Khiếu Thị Huyền Trang from Bắc Giang.

Lại Thị Thanh Hương will compete in the All-Stars cycle where she finished 8th place.

Phạm Thị Hương, who finished 8th place, also competed in various beauty pageants until she won Miss Universe Vietnam 2015, and represented Vietnam in Miss Universe 2015, she also served as mentor of The Face Vietnam.

Hosts 
At the beginning of the show, Nathan Lee and Elizabeth Thủy Tiên were criticized for competing to lead the judging panel. Nathan Lee is a former international supermodel who speaks fluent Vietnamese, while female supermodel Elizabeth lived overseas for so long that her Vietnamese deteriorated. They were both replaced after two episodes. The new judging members were model Vũ Nguyễn Hà Anh, designer Huy Võ and former male model Đức Hải.

The replacement jury complained that they had no chance to pick contestants, weakening the field. The original jury reported that producers also refused to allow them choose the contestants, leading them to resign. The producers, however, announced that the change was because Nathan Lee and Elizabeth competed against each other for the host position and because there were so many conflicts between judges and producers, etc.

Winner 
The winner was 20-year-old Khiếu Thị Huyền Trang from Bắc Giang. She took all the prizes, including:
 A two-year contract with CA Model and Talent Management locally, worth $50.000 and with Wilhelmina Models internationally for one year
 A $15.000 VIP Diamond Membership card at California Fitness & Yoga Center 
 A cover of Her World magazine. 
 A Piaggio Vespa LX 150
 A $10.000 diamond ring from Unique Jewelries 
 2-year supply of Revlon that worths over $10,000.

Criticism 
Throughout the airing process, the show was criticized for unrealistic moments and catfights between contestants and for the judges' emphasis on Khiếu Thị Huyền Trang, who was crowned the winner and was the tallest contestant.

First runner-up Tuyết Lan, and other contestants, notably Đàm Thu Trang, Hoàng Oanh, Bảo Trân, Bích Trâm were discovered to have worked as professional editorial models or catwalk models prior to the contest. The producers did not disqualify them or give an official statement, while they disqualified the  ethnically Khmer model Lâm Thu Hằng (Miss Vietnam 2008, Top 5) during casting.

Many Vietnamese fashionistas claimed disappointment with the show. Neither panel of judges were notable in the Vietnamese fashion industry. The panels were also criticized for including too few members. The lack of guest stars or guest judges led to boredom. Notably, Huy Võ became a judge while still studying at Fashion Institute of Design & Merchandising.

Later, it was reported that the script of the season finale was similar to that of the fourth season of Germany's Next Topmodel in 2009.

Contestants

Episode summaries

Casting weeks 
Air date: September 30 & October 7, 2010
Contestants gathered at White Palace for casting. Every girl had to walk on a long runway and showed her signature poses. 60 made it to the next round, before being further cut to 24 and then 14. The final fourteen sat down with judges to discuss their strengths and weakness. Nine girls advanced to the final round simultaneously after they knew the first five girls had been eliminated.

One week later, the show moved to Hanoi. Like the previous casting format, every contestant had to express herself in front of a crowd. Another nine girls were added from their photos to make a field of 18.

Featured photographer: Kevin Freeman
Judges: Hoàng Ngân, Nathan Lee, Elizabeth Thủy Tiên

Week 3 
Air date: October 14, 2010
The 18 contestants arrived at International Asiana Hotel where Germ Doornbos and Le Khiet invited them to a grand party. Mỹ Phương won the first challenge with her friendly look and her elegant manners. The prize was a VIP double room that she shared with Tuyết Lan. In late afternoon, the girls met Hà Anh the new head judge. Anh asked them to perform a runway walk and gave advice. Bùi Thùy won the runway challenge and got two outfits from Candy Rox Brand. Hoài Thương also won a prize.

The week's photo shoot took place in Nguyễn Long Studio where the girls met the new second judge Huy Võ and photographer Nguyễn Long. Some were unused to shooting, so Hà Anh helped them relax through music and dance.

At the judging panel, the last main judge appeared. Thu Hiền wowed the judging with a spectacular moment of beauty that was totally in contrast to her appearance, as did Diệp Anh. Most girls did not perform well due to lack of experience. Hà Anh revealed that four girls would be sent home. In the end, only three girls left instead of four, including: Bích Trâm, Bảo Trân and Quý Dung, because judges could not unanimously eliminate either Thanh Hằng nor Giáng Hương.

Featured photographer: Nguyễn Long
Special guests: Mrs. Hoàng Thạch Thảo, Mr. Germ Doornbos, Mr. Lê Khiết, Jennifer Nguyen

Week 4 
Air date: October 21, 2010
The 15 remaining girls moved to their Top Model House, but there were only 12 beds. Bùi Thùy who didn't find any slot, asked Thu Hiền to share the big bed. Unexpectedly, she sat on Thu Hiền's pillow and took her beauty shot, resulting in the first catfight.

Next morning, well-known make-up artist Thanh Phước dropped by to teach make-up tips. In this week's challenge, the girls were tasked to walk on a well-known avenue. Đàm Trang received all of the prizes and shared them with Diệp Anh.

The judging panel again praised Thu Hiền and Phạm Hương for their Vietnamese and stunning faces. Thanh Hằng, Thu Thủy and Tuyết Lan showed almost the same look week after week and were criticized. Ultimately, Thanh Hương, Hoài Thương and Thu Thủy landed into the bottom three with ill performances; only Thu Thủy was saved.

First call-out: Trần Thị Thu Hiền
Bottom three: Lại Thị Thanh Huong, Trần Lê Hoài Thương & Nguyễn Thu Thủy
Eliminated: Lại Thị Thanh Huong & Trần Lê Hoài Thương
Featured photographer: Freedom
Special guests: Thanh Phước, Lê Quốc Tuấn

Week 5 
Air date: October 28
Thu Thùy continued made mistakes that isolated her from the others. Diệp Anh found she couldn't take the pressure, so she talked with Bùi Thùy to deal with the problems between Bùi Thùy and the other girls. Tensions eased at Thanh Hoa's birthday party.
 
The week's photo shoot required girls to portray 1920s Vietnamese women living in a haunted mansion for the Halloween portfolio. Hà Anh directed the girls. Most of the photos received mixed to positive reviews, especially, Thu Thủy, Thanh Hoa, Thu Hiền and Mỹ Phương. Judges were quite impressed by the improvements of Thu Thủy and Thanh Hoa whose weak expressions led to expectations that they wouldn't last. Bùi Thùy was sent home although the judges felt that she had a unique look.

First call-out: Thu Thủy
Bottom two: Bùi Thùy & Hương Phạm
Eliminated: Bùi Thùy
Featured photographer: Kevin German
Special guests: Miss Mint, Al Morgan, Randy Dobson, Annie Nguyen

Week 6 
Air date: November 4, 2010
Hà Anh informed twelve girls that they would receive makeovers. At night, Hà Anh made a surprise visit to the house. She joined hands with the contestants to cook for dinner and shared runway tips. Thanh Hoa won the challenge and got high-heeled shoes from Hà Anh's collection. The next morning, they went to Đầm Sen Park and did a runway walk with bulldogs. Boma and Đức Hải were impressed by how Thu Thủy walked and dealt with the dogs. As the winner, Thu Thủy shared the prizes randomly with Phạm Hương. Thu Thủy opened the show with a Bebe Pham fashion show that featured many Vietnamese Top Models.

The weekly photo shoot required models to pose as leaping athletes, while portraying sports listed below:

At panel, Boma, Randy Dobson and David Dougan sat in as guest judges. Thanh Hoa and Giáng Hương received universal praise and an offer from Randy, the President of California Center and of CA Models. The girls would feature on the main site of California Club and will a worldwide ad for one month. Thanh Hằng was found boring and landed her in the bottom two with 12-year-old-child look-alike Hoàng Oanh. At the end, Thanh Hằng was out.

First call-out: Thanh Hoa
Bottom two: Thanh Hằng & Hoàng Oanh
Eliminated: Thanh Hằng
Featured photographer: David Dougan
Special guests: Boma Sandra, Randy Dobson

Week 7 
Air date: November 11, 2010
Editors from Her World magazine talked with contestants about their strengths and weaknesses prior to a shopping challenge at Vincom Center. Mỹ Phương won the reward challenge, but the other girls disagreed because her outfit was too similar to the challenge judge's. Next day, Hà Anh and Huy Võ took them to a nightclub. They met rocker Phạm Anh Khoa who appeared in the week's photo shoot. Thu Hiền won the week. Mỹ Phương was praised as a rock princess. Hoàng Oanh was sent home.

First call-out: Thu Hiền
Bottom three: Giáng Hương, Thu Thủy & Hoàng Oanh
Eliminated: Hoàng Oanh
Featured photographer: Kevin German
Featured designs: Hà Trương
Special guests: Editors from Her World (Nguyễn Hồng Hạnh, Hà Mi, Kim Thuận, Thùy Linh), Donia Medini, Phạm Anh Khoa, Hà Trương

Week 8 
Air date: November 18, 2010
Mrs. Thiên Hương came to their house and shared her experiences.  Diệp Anh won the close talk. She got mad at Huyền Trang and stated that she would leave the unfair competition, but was prevented. In the other challenge, the girls were supposedly at a Press Conference and received some unexpected questions. Thu Hiền won this challenge. She had a chance to be at the red carpet of Jimmy Choo New Brand Launch in Vietnam. She picked Tuyết Lan up to go accompany her.

At the photo shoot, the girls were required to portray 1940s ladies living in Saigon. During deliberation, Thanh Hoa and Đàm Trang wowed judges because they knew how to work with their not too perfect bodies and faces. Others didn't know, especially Phạm Hương. That landed her into the bottom two with Diệp Anh. Judges felt Diệp Anh should be a choreographer rather than be a model and sent her home.

First call-out: Đàm Trang
Bottom two: Diệp Anh & Phạm Hương
Eliminated: Diep Anh
Featured photographer: David Dougan
Featured designs: Hà Khúc Nhật Minh, Diệu Anh
Special guests: editors from Her World Magazine (Trần Nguyễn Thiên Hương, Hoàng Nguyên Vũ, Huyền Ngọc), Dolev "Sunshine" Sadan

Week 9 
Air date: November 25, 2010
Boma stopped by for a while, picked 3 girls up alongside Thu Thủy and Phạm Hương for a Bebe Fashion Show. After the show, they went home with hopes that they would be celebrated. Tensions rose when they were ignored. Next day, all girls were invited for dinner with guests. Hà Anh revealed the most important person of the day was Đàm Vinh Hưng who surprised the girls. At the end of the night, they walked for Đỗ Mạnh Cường as a runway challenge. Thu Hiền won again and shared a set of Unique Diamond Jewelry with Thu Thủy.

At the photo shoot they were frightened by a python, which was in the pictures with them.

At judging panel, the judges were displeased by Mỹ Phương's single facial expression; of Thu Hiền's instability and of Thu Thủy's inability to transfer emotion and personality to a photo. Huyền Trang once again made judges feel like she didn't know her advantages, but the photo was quite good. As a result, Mỹ Phương packed her bags and went home over her lack of versatility.

First call-out: NguyễnGiáng Hương
Bottom two: Đỗ Thị Thanh Hoa & Hồ Mỹ Phương
Eliminated: Hồ Mỹ Phương
Featured photographer: Freedom
Featured designs: Đỗ Mạnh Cường
Special guests: Mr. Bùi Tân Xuân, designer Đỗ Mạnh Cường, Đàm Vĩnh Hưng

Week 10 
Air date: December 2, 2010
The girls shoot their first Unique commercial.

First call-out: Nguyễn Thu Thủy
Bottom two:Đỗ Thị Thanh Hoa & Hương Phạm
Eliminated: Hương Phạm
Featured director:
Featured designs:
Special guests:

Week 11 
Air date: December 9, 2010
The bus took girls to Mũi Né, Phan Thiết where they received tips for walking on sand like a Chăm Lady. Prior to the week's challenge, contestants joined in a fashion show for local fisherman. Huyền Trang officially won the reward and Thu Hiền was chosen to join the winner's reward for her attempt.

The photo shoot of the week was taken on a dune. The girls were tasked to act as soft as the dress in Gone With The Wind. Giáng Hương, Huyền Trang and 
Đàm Trang did not do well. At the end, Giáng Hương was eliminated. Đàm Trang again survived.

First call-out: Nguyễn Thị Tuyết Lan
Bottom two: Đàm Thu Trang & Nguyễn Giáng Hương
Eliminated: Nguyễn Giáng Hương
Featured photographer: Kevin German
Featured designs:
Special guests: Mr. Nguyễn Đình, Mrs. Kim Tuyến

Week 12 
Air date: December 16, 2010
Huy Võ dropped by the house, bringing chè to have with the girls. Later, Hà Anh came in and helped share thoughts on life. Thanh Hoa felt so much pressure that she desired to leave the competition. The decision was not yet made. Next day, Huy Võ revealed that the photo shoot's theme was flying fairy, which exhausted the girls. In the end, Tuyết Lan, Thu Hiền and Đàm Trang landed to bottom three for the first time. Tuyết Lan was a perfect and passionate model with beauty and personality, but her health did not allow her to perform; Thu Hiền was like Tuyết Lan, but she had a rough attitude and could not focus and Đàm Trang used the same expression from week to week. Only Thu Trang was eliminated.

First call-out: Đỗ Thị Thanh Hoa
Bottom three: Nguyễn Thị Tuyết Lan, Trần Thị Thu Hiền & Đàm Thu Trang
Eliminated: Đàm Thu Trang
Featured photographer: David Dougan
Featured designs:
Special guests: Randy Dobson, Miss Mint & Al Morgan, Đức Tiến

Week 13 
Air date: December 23, 2010
The show began with girls going to audition for fashion shows. For the photo shoot of the week, they did another commercial shot for Piaggio.

First call-out: Khiếu Thị Huyền Trang
Bottom two: Đỗ Thị Thanh Hoa & Trần Thị Thu Hiền
Eliminated: Trần Thị Thu Hiền
Featured photographer: David Dougan

Week 14 
Air date: January 9, 2011

First call-out: Khiếu Thị Huyền Trang
Bottom two: Nguyễn Thị Tuyết Lan & Đỗ Thị Thanh Hoa
Eliminated: Thị Thanh Hoa
Featured photographer: David Dougan

Week 15 
Air date: January 16, 2011

This is the recap episode.

Week 16 
Air date: January 23, 2011
After five months, the three remaining contestants were Khieu Thi Huyen Trang, Nguyen Thi Tuyet Lan and Nguyen Thu Thuy. The final week was broadcast live on 23 January from InterContinental Asiana Saigon. The girls walk in the designs of designer Do Manh Cuong. This is the meeting of Top 8 and many famous singers. The show representative said that the final show would involve Vietnam fashion industry celebrities.

Final 3: Khiếu Thị Huyền Trang, Nguyễn Thị Tuyết Lan & Nguyễn Thu Thủy
Eliminated: Nguyễn Thu Thủy
Final 2:  Khiếu Thị Huyền Trang & Nguyễn Thị Tuyết Lan
Vietnam's Next Top Model 2010: Khiếu Thị Huyền Trang

Summaries

Call-out order

 The contestant was eliminated
 The contestant won the competition
Episode 1 : Close Up Photoshoot Glaze Honey, Magazine Covered With Honey And Bee Colonies

Episode 2 : Animal And Plant Body Painting

Episode 3 : Strong And Elegances With Gowns In The Fly With Flying Swing

Episode 4 : Hollywood Action Photo and Video

Episode 5 : Beauty Aura In Above Water And Wave With Squid And Octopus

Episode 6 : Adventureal Couture

Episode 7 : 4 Compcard (Tropical Editorial,Glam Editorial,High-Fashion Editorial,Body Movement)

Episode 8 : Cordoba Era,Bad Fairy Tale 

Episode 9 : High Fashion With Parachute,Head In Avant Garde Miniature In Personality And Fierce

Episode 10 : Queen Of Mesopotamia Tribe With Colonies In Petra Mount

Episode 11 : Model Of Fashion In Dubai At 7 Catalogue Photoshoot

Episode 12 : Dramatical Love In Motion Video, Atlantis Queen,Arabic Dessert Runaway

Episode 13 : High Fashion In Head Piece,High Fashion In Lingerie,High Fashion In Paint

Episode 14 : Documenter High Fashion Video, Elle Cover Magazine,Volkswaggen Ambassador

Average  call-out order

Photo Shoot Guide 
Episode 1 & 2 Photo Shoots: Promo Shots (Casting)
Episode 3 Photo Shoot: Posing in the rain
Episode 4 Photo Shoot: Beauty Shot
Episode 5 Photo Shoot: Vietnamese 1920s Halloween
Episode 6 Photo Shoot: Jumping in sporty clothes for California Fitness & Yoga Center
Episode 7 Photo Shoot: Rock Your Fashion
Episode 8 Photo Shoot: Back to the 1940s
Episode 9 Photo Shoot: Extreme Beauty Shot with a Python
Episode 10 Commercial: Unique Diamond
Episode 11 Photo Shoot: Flowing in Mũi Né
Episode 12 Photo Shoot: Fairy's Flying
Episode 13 Commercial: Vespa LX 150 Commercial and Print Ad
Episode 14 Photo Shoot: The Ice Queen
Episode 16 Photo Shoots: Her World Magazine Coversl; Diva Shots

Judges

Casting
 Nathan Lee, Former Male Model / FTV Magazine Manager & Editor
 Elizabeth Thủy Tiên, International Model
 Jennifer Nguyen, Fashion Designer

Main
 Hà Anh, Vietnamese Top Model / Head Judge
 Đức Hải, Male Model / Judge
 Jennifer Nguyen Fashion Designer / Guest Judge

Aftermath 
Tuyết Lan signed with Wilhelmina Models. She walked for the New York Fashion Week Fall/Winter 2013
Huyền Trang walked for New York Fashion Week, J Autumn Fashion Week in London and pursued both acting and modelling careers.

Magazine appearances 
 Elle Vietnam: Tuyết Lan (April 2011, editorials), Thu Hiền (July 2011, editorials), Huyền Trang (August 2011), Huyền Trang & Tuyết Lan (October 2011, F/W Fashion Week promoter), Hà Anh-Huyền Trang-Tuyết Lan (November 2011, 1st anniversary editorials) Tuyết Lan (February 2012, special cover), Tuyết Lan (April 2013), Huyền Trang (June 2015), Phạm Hương (November 2016, 6th anniversary editorials), Huyền Trang (November 2016, 6th anniversary editorials)
 Her World: Mỹ Phương (December 2010 as her challenge reward, editorials), Huyền Trang (February 2011 as a part of her prize), Tuyết Lan (September 2011), Tuyết Lan (November 2011), Huyền Trang (July 2013), Tuyết Lan (January 2014), Phạm Hương (June 2016)
 F-Thời trang: Huyền Trang & Tuyết Lan (August 2011), Huyền Trang (June 2015)
 Cosmopolitan: Tuyết Lan (May 2012), Phạm Hương (November 2015)
 Glow (Singapore): Thu Hiền (January - March 2014)
 Grow & Life: Thu Hiền (April 2015), Huyền Trang (March 2017)
 Harper's Bazaar: Tuyết Lan (June 2012), Huyền Trang (June 2014 - Singapore); Huyền Trang (August 2016 - Vietnam)
 Đẹp: Huyền Trang (November 2013), Tuyết Lan (May 2014), Phạm Hương (October 2016 with Lan Khuê)
 L'Officiel: Huyền Trang (August 2015), Huyền Trang (September 2016)
 Wove (England): Huyền Trang (May 2014)
 Style: Phạm Hương (August 2016)
 Young Style: Phạm Hương (August 2016)
 Vogue Thailand: Tuyết Lan (May 2015)
 Pulp (Canada): Tuyết Lan (June 2013)
 Sicky: Tuyết Lan (July 2013, editorials)
 Rouge China: Tuyết Lan (July 2013)
 Superior: Tuyết Lan (November 2013, editorials)
 Pink Revista: Tuyết Lan (March 2014)
 Golf & Life: Phạm Hương (October 2016)
 Heritage Fashion: Phạm Hương
 Tiếp thị & Gia đình: Phạm Hương

Television/media appearances 
Family Feud (HTV7): Thu Trang
 Style & Star (Yeah 1): Thu Trang & Diệp Anh
 Tôi muốn làm Siêu mẫu (VTV9): Bích Trâm - better known as Trâm Anh
 (Yeah 1): Tuyết Lan
 Chat với V6 (VTV6): Tuyết Lan
 Người mẫu (VTV3): Bích Trâm
 "Model: Take My Picture" by Hà Anh: Thu Hiền, Thanh Hoa & Huyền Trang
 Cưới ngay kẻo lỡ: Bích Trâm
 Bếp hát: Diệp Anh (as Diệp Lâm Anh)
 Con ma nhà họ Vương: Diệp Anh (as Diệp Lâm Anh)
 Siêu nhân X: Diệp Anh (as Diệp Lâm Anh)
 "Tìm lại bầu trời" by Tuấn Hưng: Diệp Anh - better known as Diệp Lâm Anh
 Thời trang & Cuộc sống (HTV7): Tuyết Lan & Bích Trâm
 The Amazing Race Vietnam (VTV3): Diệp Anh (as Diệp Lâm Anh), Thu Hiền & Thanh Hoa
 The Amazing Race Vietnam (VTV3): Huyền Trang
 The Amazing Race Vietnam (VTV3): Thu Hiền & Thanh Hoa
 The Face Vietnam: Phạm Hương (mentor)
 Không giới hạn - Sasuke Vietnam: Diệp Anh (as Diệp Lâm Anh) (host season 1 & 2)
 Phái mạnh Việt: Diệp Anh (as Diệp Lâm Anh) (host season 2)
 Vietnam's Got Talent (season 4): Diệp Anh (as Diệp Lâm Anh) (host)

Beauty pageants/Model competitions 
Tuyết Lan: Asian Model Search 2011 (winner), Elite Model Look 2011
Huyền Trang: Best Model of the World 2011 (Best Asia winner)
Phạm Hương: Make Me a F-Idol (winner), Miss World Sport 2014 (First Runner-up), Top 10 Miss Vietnam 2014, Miss Universe Vietnam 2015 (winner), Miss Universe (2015)
Thanh Hương: Miss Parkson, Vietnam Supermodel 2013, Elite Model Look Vietnam 2014, Miss All Nations Pageant 2016, Vietnam's Next Top Model (cycle 8) (8th)

Fashion shows 
Thu Thùy, Thanh Hương, Bích Trâm and Thanh Hằng walked for Đẹp Fashion Show 9: Dreaming right after being eliminated.
Thu Hiền, Thu Thủy together with Hà Anh walked for Chất: Jeans Fashion Show.
Thu Hiền walked for Elle Summer Fashion Show 2011.
Thu Hiền, Huyền Trang, Hoài Thương, Bích Trâm (better known as Trâm Anh) with Cycle 2 host Xuân Lan walked for Elle Fall/Winter Fashion Show 2011. Plus, Thu Hiền is featured face for featured designer Lê Thanh Hòa.
Huyền Trang is a featured face for featured designer Võ Việt Chung at J Autumn Fashion Week in London.

Sponsorships 

 Aquafina
 Audi
 California Fitness & Yoga Center
 CA Models & Talent Agency
 Candy Rox
Clairol Hair Care
 GUESS?
 Her World Magazine
 InterContinental Asiana Saigon
 Levi's
 Martell Cognac
 Piaggio
 Revlon
 UNICEF
 Unique Diamond from Belgium
 White Palace Convention Center

References

External links 
List of television programmes broadcast by Vietnam Television (VTV)
 Vietnam's Next Top Model Official Site
 Application Form

Vietnam's Next Top Model
2010s Vietnamese television series
2010 Vietnamese television seasons
2011 Vietnamese television seasons